Bickley is a surname. Notable people with the surname include:

Ancella Radford Bickley (born 1930), American historian and educator
Augustus Charles Bickley (1857–1902), British journalist, novelist, and biographer
Benjamin Bickley Rogers (1828–1919), British classical scholar and barrister
Bickley baronets (generations from 1582–1752), a baronetcy in Norfolk, England
Clayton Clealand Bickley Mitchel [see: Clayton Mitchell (Australian politician)] (1900–1988)
Dan Bickley (born 1963), American sports writer and radio host, and guitarist
George Harvey Bickley (1868–1924), American Methodist Episcopal bishop
George W. L. Bickley (1823–1867), American Civil War figure, physician, secret society founder, and novelist
Graham Bickley (born 1958), British actor and singer
John Bickley (disambiguation), several people
Joseph Bickley [see: Real tennis] (1835–1923), British builder, designer, and inventor 
Howard L. Bickley (1871–1947), American lawyer, politician, and judge
Mark Bickley (born 1969), Australian rules football player
Ron Bickley (1926–2020), Australian rules football player
Susan Bickley, British mezzo-soprano opera singer
Thomas Bickley (1518–1596), British Protestant bishop, Marian exile, and college warden
Wallace Bickley (1810–1876), British-born Australian politician
William E. Bickley (1914–2010), American entomologist
William S. Bickley Jr. [see: Bickley-Warren Productions] (born 1947), American TV writer and producer